TechLive (formerly known as ZDTV News and TechTV News) was an American live television program that aired from 1998 to 2004 on TechTV, a former television channel that specialized in technology.

Operations
The program broadcast technology- and entertainment-related news, product reviews, and stock market reports. The program was cancelled when the TechTV and G4 channels merged in early 2004.

External links

2001 American television series debuts
2004 American television series endings
2000s American television news shows
Business-related television series
English-language television shows
TechTV original programming